Kazlų Rūda Municipality is one of 60 municipalities in Lithuania.

Elderships 
Kazlų Rūda Municipality is divided into 4 elderships:

References

Municipalities of Marijampolė County
Municipalities of Lithuania